Webert da Silva Miguel (born 15 November 1986, in Ibirité), or simply  Beto, is a Brazilian football player.

Career
After spending the first two years of his career in his home country with Social Futebol Clube, Beto relocated to Bulgaria in June 2007, signing a three-year contract with Belasitsa Petrich. He made 35 appearances in all competitions and scored 4 goals for Belasitsa. In January 2009, the Brazilian midfielder transferred to Slavia Sofia. On the 8th Beto officially signed his 2,5 years contract. Until the end of the 2008-09 season he played 10 matches for the club, scoring three goals. In June 2009 Beto was transferred to Montana.

External links
 
 Brazilian FA Database

1986 births
Living people
Brazilian footballers
Sportspeople from Minas Gerais
Association football midfielders
PFC Belasitsa Petrich players
PFC Slavia Sofia players
FC Montana players
FC Urartu players
FC Etar 1924 Veliko Tarnovo players
First Professional Football League (Bulgaria) players
Expatriate footballers in Bulgaria
Expatriate footballers in Armenia
Brazilian expatriate sportspeople in Bulgaria
Armenian Premier League players